The Jhamar are a Hindu  caste found in the state of Uttar Pradesh in India. They are also known as Jhaunwar.

Origin 
The Jhamar are an occupational Hindu caste traditionally associated with basket makers. According to some traditions, the word Jhamar is a corruption of the Hindi word jhaua, which means a basket. The Jhamar themselves claim to be Lodhas, who took up the occupation of basket making. Over time this change of occupation led to the formation of a distinct community. The Jhamar are involved in the making of baskets from the twigs of the Arhar plant. They are a small community, found mainly in the districts of Barabanki, Lucknow and Unnao. The Jhamar speak Awadhi among themselves and Hindi with outsiders.

Present Circumstances 
The Jhamar are strictly endogamous and practice clan exogamy. They are a landless community, with basket making still their principle occupation. A significant number of Jhamar are now daily wage labourers, involved in occupations such as rickshaw pulling. Each Jhamar settlement also contains a biradari panchayat, an informal caste association, which acts as an instrument of social control.

See also 

 Bandhmati

References 

Social groups of Uttar Pradesh
Indian castes